Asrar is a daily newspaper in Iran. It may also refer to

People
Asrar (name)

Publications
Asrar-i-Khudi, philosophical poetry book of Allama Iqbal 
Asrar al-Tawhid, book about the Sufi mystic Abu Sa'id Abu'l-Khayr
Kashf al-Asrar (1943), book by Ruhollah Khomeini 
Makhzan ol-Asrar, Persian poem book by Nizami Ganjavi